Andrea Ramirez was a Spanish painter and prescribed manuscripts.

References

People from Seville
16th-century Spanish painters
Spanish male painters
Spanish Renaissance painters
Year of death unknown
Year of birth unknown